Malcolm, Malcom, Máel Coluim, or Maol Choluim is a Scottish Gaelic given name meaning "devotee of Saint Columba".

Literature
Malcolm Azania, Canadian teacher, writer, community activist, radio host, and political aspirant
Malcolm Bradbury (1932–2000), British author and academic
Malcolm Cowley (1898–1989), American novelist, poet, literary critic, and journalist
Malcolm Forbes (1919–1990), publisher of Forbes magazine
Malcolm Lowry (1909–1957), English poet and novelist
Malcolm Muir (1885–1979), American magazine industrialist
Malcolm Wheeler-Nicholson (1890–1968), American pulp magazine writer and entrepreneur

Music
Malcolm Archer (born 1952), English organist, conductor, and composer
Malcolm Arnold (1921–2006), British composer
Malcolm Bilson (born 1935), American pianist
Malcolm Burn (born 1960), Canadian musician
Malcom Catto, English drummer and musician
Malcolm Clarke (composer) (1943–2003), British composer
Malcolm Forsyth (1936–2011), Canadian musician
Malcolm Goldstein (born 1936), American violinist
 Malcolm McCormick (1992–2018), birth name of Mac Miller, American rapper, singer and songwriter
Malcolm McLaren (1946–2010), English musician and producer of the Sex Pistols
Malcolm Middleton (born 1973), Scottish musician
Malcolm Mooney, African-American rock music singer, poet, and artist
 Malcolm Rebennack (1941–2019), birth name of Dr. John, American singer and songwriter
Malcolm Sargent (1895–1967), British conductor, organist, and composer
Malcolm Williamson (1931–2003), Australian composer
Malcolm Young (1953–2017), Australian rhythm guitarist for AC/DC
Malcolm David Kelley (1992), rapper, mostly known for MKTO with Tony Oller

Politics
Malcolm Baldrige Jr. (1922–1987), American politician and 26th United States Secretary of Commerce
Malcolm Bruce (born 1944), Scottish politician
Malcolm Caldwell (1931–1978), a prominent British academic and communist intellectual and a strong supporter of Pol Pot's rule in Democratic Kampuchea
Lord Malcolm Douglas-Hamilton (1909–1964), Scottish politician and aviator
Malcolm Fraser (1930–2015), 22nd Prime Minister of Australia
Malcolm H. Kerr (1931–1984), political scientist and teacher who was an expert on Middle East politics
Malcolm Lafargue (1908–1963), U.S. attorney in Shreveport, Louisiana, 1941 to 1950
Malcolm MacDonald (1901–1981), British politician and diplomat
Malcolm Mackerras (born 1939), Australian psephologist and commentator and lecturer on Australian and American politics
Malcolm Offord, Scottish financier and politician
Malcolm Rifkind (born 1946), Scottish Conservative and Unionist politician
Malcolm Sinclair, 20th Earl of Caithness, British Conservative politician and member of the House of Lords
Malcolm Turnbull (born 1954), Prime Minister of Australia (2015–2018)
Malcolm Wallop (1933–2011), American politician and United States Senator
Malcolm Wicks (1947–2012), English politician
Malcolm Shepherd, 2nd Baron Shepherd (1918–2001), Leader of the Labour Party in the House of Lords, 1974 to 1976

Religion
Malcolm X (1925–1965), Afro-American civil rights leader and Nation of Islam minister
Malcolm Muggeridge (1903–1990), British journalist, author, satirist, media personality, soldier, spy, and Christian scholar
Malcolm Ranjith (born 1947), 11th Archbishop of Colombo

Sports
Malcolm Allen (swimmer), Australian freestyle swimmer
Malcolm Allison (1927–2010), English footballer and football manager
Malcolm Bunche (born 1991), American football player
Malcolm Butler (born 1990), American football player
Malcolm Cameron, Miami Dolphins head coach (better known as "Cam" Cameron)
Malcom Chalmers, Australian Paralympic swimmer
Malcolm Campbell (1885–1948), English racing motorist and motoring journalist
Malcolm Champion, New Zealand's first Olympic gold medallist
Malcolm Elliott (born 1961), English professional cyclist
Malcom Floyd (born 1981), American football wide receiver
Malcolm Glazer (1928–2014), American businessman and sports-team owner
Malcolm Hill (basketball), American in the Israel Basketball Premier League
Malcolm Jenkins (born 1987), American football player
Malcolm Koonce (born 1998), American football player
Malcolm Lee (basketball) (born 1990), American basketball player
Malcolm Macdonald (born 1950), English footballer and football manager
Malcolm Marshall, cricketer
Malcolm McPhail (1895–1975), Scottish footballer
Malcolm Poole, Australian field hockey player
Malcolm Reilly, British rugby league player and coach
Malcolm Roach (born 1998), American football player
Malcolm Sampson, English rugby league footballer who played in the 1950s, 1960s and 1970s
Malcolm Simpson (1933–2020), New Zealand cyclist
Malcolm Thomas (born 1988), American professional basketball player
Malcom Adu Ares (born 2001), Spanish footballer
Malcom Filipe Silva de Oliveira, Brazilian footballer
Malcolm Shaw (soccer) (born 1995), Canadian soccer player
Malcolm Smith, American football player and MVP of Super Bowl XLVIII
Malcolm Subban, Canadian hockey goaltender

Television and film
Malcolm Lee Beggs (1907–1956), American actor
Malcolm Gets (born 1964), American actor
Malcolm Hulke (1924–1979), English screenwriter 
Malcolm David Kelley (born 1992), American rapper, singer, songwriter and actor
Malcolm D. Lee (born 1970), American director, producer and screenwriter 
Malcolm McDowell (born 1943), English actor and producer 
Malcolm McFee (1949–2001), English actor 
Malcolm Spellman, American screenwriter and producer
Malcolm-Jamal Warner (born 1970), American actor, director, producer and singer
Malcolm Danare (born 1962), American actor, producer and writer

Other
Malcolm I of Scotland
Malcolm II of Scotland
Malcolm Barber (born 1943), English historian
Malcolm Bowie (1943–2007), British academic
Malcolm Bricklin (born 1939), American automotive entrepreneur
Malcolm Browne (born 1933), American journalist and photographer
Malcolm Cole (1949-1995), Aboriginal dancer and teacher at NAISDA Dance College, Sydney
Malcolm Fairley (born 1952), British criminal and sex offender
Malcolm Garrett (born 1956), British graphic designer
Malcolm Gladwell (born 1963), Canadian journalist
Malcom Glenn (born 1987), American writer and journalist
Malcolm Hardee (1950–2005), English comedian
Malcolm Kendall-Smith, unit medical officer with the British Royal Air Force
Malcolm Kilduff (1927–2003), American journalist
Malcolm Laycock, (1938–2009), British radio presenter and producer
Malcom McLean (1913–2001), American entrepreneur
Malcolm B. Montgomery (1891–1974), Justice of the Supreme Court of Mississippi
Malcolm Morley (born 1931), English-born artist now living in the United States
Malcolm Perry (disambiguation), multiple people 
Malcolm Sayer (1916–1970), British automobile designer
Sir Malcolm Stewart, 1st Baronet, founder of The London Brick Company

Fictional
 Malcolm Bright, protagonist of Prodigal Son
 Malcolm Dresden, father of Harry Dresden in The Dresden Files
Malcolm McDuck, a Disney character who is an ancestor of Scrooge McDuck and Donald Duck
Malcolm Merlyn, a major villain in the superhero television series Arrow
 Malcolm Pace, fictional demigod character from Percy Jackson and the Olympians by Rick Riordan. He is the son of Athena.
 Malcolm Reed, fictional human character of British descent in the TV series Star Trek: Enterprise
Malcolm Reynolds, character in the science fiction television series Firefly
Malcolm Tucker, master of spin in Armando Iannucci's The Thick of It and In the Loop
 Malcolm Fitzcarraldo, the secret identity of Monarch Venture Bros
 Malcolm, A fictional human character in Dawn of the Planet of the Apes he is the co-leader and former Architect of the San Francisco Colony with former Police Chief turned Mayor Dreyfus, he soon develops a bond with ape leader Caesar.
Malcolm Wilkerson, the main character of Malcolm in the Middle, a television situation comedy

See also
List of Scottish Gaelic given names

Masculine given names
Scottish masculine given names
English masculine given names